Maigret at the Crossroads is a detective novel by the Belgian writer Georges Simenon. Published in 1931, it is one of the earliest novels to feature Inspector Maigret in the role of the chief police investigator, a character that has since become one of the best-known detectives in fiction.

Premise
The plot of the novel is driven by the murder of Isaac Goldberg, a Jewish diamond merchant, in a place outside Paris known as the Three Widows' Crossroads.

Characters
The cast of characters includes:
 Carl Andersen and Else Andersen, an aristocratic Danish duo who live in a secluded house at the crossroads
 Monsieur Michonnet, an insurance agent in whose car the body of Goldberg was found
 Monsieur Oscar, the owner of the service station at the crossroads

Translation
Originally written in French, the novel was translated into English by Robert Baldick and published by Penguin in 1963.

In other media
It was dramatized as Night at the Crossroads in 1932 in a film written and directed by Jean Renoir, starring the director's brother Pierre Renoir as Inspector Maigret and in 2017 in the later ITV series, starring Rowan Atkinson.

References

External links 

Maigret at trussel.com

1931 Belgian novels
Belgian novels adapted into films
Maigret novels
Novels set in France